Miriam Lexmann (born 2 December 1972) is a Slovak politician. She has been a Member of the European Parliament since February 2020. She is a member of the Christian Democratic Movement.

Political career 
Before running for office, Lexmann worked for the political nonprofit International Republican Institute (IRI).

Lexmann stood for her party at the 2019 European Parliament election in Slovakia failing to win a seat immediately but securing a seat among the British seats that were redistributed after the UK left the European Union. She took her seat in the European Parliament after Brexit.

References

External links 
 Official website

Living people
1972 births
Politicians from Bratislava
21st-century Slovak women politicians
21st-century Slovak politicians
Slovak Democratic and Christian Union – Democratic Party politicians
Slovak Democratic and Christian Union – Democratic Party MEPs
MEPs for Slovakia 2019–2024
Women MEPs for Slovakia
Comenius University alumni